Lorenzo Alaimo (born 15 June 1952) is a former Italian racing cyclist. He finished in last place in the 1974 Tour de France.

References

External links
 

1952 births
Living people
Italian male cyclists
Cyclists from Hainaut (province)
20th-century Italian people